The Jashak (dashti)salt dome, «in Persian : Kuh-e-Namak ( » means mountain of salt) lies in the Zagros Mountains in southwestern Iran. The salt dome is between Dashti County and Dayyer County in Bushehr Province and lies near the Gankhak-e Raisi in Kaki and Dashti County.

The Jashak salt dome is considered one of the most beautiful of Iran's salt domes, which are included in the tentative list of world heritage sites of Iran.

References

Links
 Geomorphological Structures of Jashak Salt Dome--《地学前缘》2009年S1期
 International Conference on Dry-Land Ecology

Geography of Bushehr Province
Geography of Iran
Protected areas of Iran
Tourist attractions in Iran
Salt domes
Tourist attractions in Bushehr Province